Eusebio Ayala is a city and district of the Cordillera Department, Paraguay. It is named after Eusebio Ayala, a former President of Paraguay. It is located approximately 72 km of the city of Asuncion, capital of the Republic of Paraguay.

This city lies on the right bank of the stream Piribebuy, being axis road from where routes depart inside and outside the department. It is well known for being the birthplace of the famous Chipa Barrero and for being located next to the fields of Acosta Ñú, where children were slain in a battle during the Paraguayan War (1864 to 1870).

Surface 

This district has a length of 338 km, with a population of approximately 20,843 inhabitants., Of which nearly 40% of the people living in urban areas, its population's density is 67.22 persons per square kilometers.

Municipality 

Eusebio Ayala was founded by Governor Carlos Morphi in the year 1770 under the name Barrero Grande. Previously, it was called the San Roque and Barrero Grande. Its current mayor is Mr. Nestor Fabian Delgadillo Diaz, of the NRA, for the period 2006 to 2010.

History 

The Battle of Acosta Ñu, the final major battle in the Paraguayan War. was fought here on August 16, 1869. The Paraguayan army, composed of, by this time in the war, 6000 mostly elderly, children, adolescents, women and invalids, faced 20 000 Brazilians and Argentinians.  The battle began with an infantry assault on Paraguayan positions which lasted for eight hours until the Paraguayans retreated to a fortified redoubt. The redoubt was destroyed by Brazilian artillery fire, and the defenders formed a defensive square around the eight cannon stationed there. However, the square was soon destroyed by a huge Brazilian cavalry charge, but the battered Paraguayan survivours managed to scatter them afterwards. The Brazilian commander, Gaston d'Orléans, ordered a final bayonet charge, which broke the remaining Paraguayan lines. General Caballero, the Paraguayan commander, finally ordered a withdrawal and left the field with his remaining 3000 troops. According to Brazilian historian Chiavenatto, when Eu noticed movements within the forest behind the plain of Acosta, he believed that they were Paraguayans preparing a counter-attack, and so ordered his engineers to burn the forest. The movement was in fact Paraguayan camp followers attempting to recover the injured from the field.

The number of children and teenagers fighting on the Paraguayan side killed in the battle today marks Children's Day in Paraguay.

Economy 

The District of Eusebio Ayala's main wealth is agriculture and the production of Chipa, which is famous for its flavor throughout the country. The inhabitants are engaged in livestock and breeding livestock beef pigs horse and sheep. In relation to agriculture, it is growing maize cotton cassava, sugarcane, snuff bean, mate, coffee, Citrus and grapes. 
The industry in Eusebio Ayala focuses on the production of traditional and delicious Cheese bun Barrero which may by accompanied with a cup of hot cooked mate tea. In this area there is a place called "The house of peanut" owned by a family of farmers, where various products made from peanuts such as cakes, sweets and ice cream can be bought.

The famous "Chipa Barrero" 

 Ramon Ayala, a former resident of the district Eusebio Ayala, was the originator of a company that turned this town famous throughout the country and also known outside the country. Rescuing the family tradition in the development of the chipà (prepared as bread maize and starch cassava, Mr. Ramon Ayala began marketing the product in the years 1970, at the beginning with a small truck, and with a high speaker, traveled to provide food until the country's capital.

There are currently more than half a hundred micro producers in the city, several stalls appreciated this product, are located on the side of the route No. 2 Mariscall José Félix Estigarribia.

Population 

The population growth rate has not undergone major changes in recent years, 
Its current total population is 20,843 inhabitants, which is overwhelmingly rural and with a slight predominance of men.

As for the projection of the population held, include the following details:

 By 2009, it is estimated a total population of 23,003 inhabitants comprising 12,201 males and 10,802 females.

Geography 

The district Eusebio Ayala, is located towards the South Centre Department of Cordillera.

Limits 

Eusebio Ayala, whose boundaries: 
 To the north Tobatí District and Isla Pucú district.
 To the south Piribebuy District and Itacurubí de la Cordillera.
 To the east Isla Pucú and Sta. Helena.
 To the west Tobatí District and Caacupé District (the spiritual capital of Paraguay) and the district of Piribebuy.

Communications 

The district of Eusebio Ayala is accessed by the international route No. 2 Mariscal José Félix Estigarribia which is the most important route, also accessed through the route No. 1 by the Department of Paraguarí.

Its roads are accessible at all times, all roads are paved, all stuffed and embankments, and stoned roads. As for roads, the villagers of their companies enjoy good stretches for vehicular traffic.

It offers digital telephone services, radio and TV channels relay.

Climate 

Predominates a dry climate and temperate, with an average temperature of 22 °C, a minimum of 3 °C and a maximum of 40 °C. The amount of rainfall in the year reaches of 1.536 mm, giving an average of 153 mm per month. The months of June and August are the months of lowest rainfall.

Demographics 

Making a connection with the district's total population it can be seen that 56.05% of the population is settled in rural areas.

Key indicators socio - demographic: 
  
 Percentage of the population under 15 years in relation to the total, 35.0%.
 The average number of children per woman, 2.7 children.
 The percentage of illiterates in the district, 5.9%.
 The proportion of the employed population in the primary sector, 30.7%.
 The percentage of the population employed in the secondary sector, 19.4%.
 The proportion of the employed population in the tertiary sector, 48.7%.
 The proportion of the employed population work in agriculture, 30.5%.
 The percentage of households with electricity, 90.4%.
 The percentage of homes with running water, 56.5%.

Notable people
Ángel Amarilla, footballer

How to get there? 

Proceeding from the city of Asuncion, taking the international route No. 2 Mariscal José Félix Estigarribia, to the departmental capital, Caacupé and continuing along the same route paved until reaching the city of Eusebio Ayala, approximately 72 kilometers from the city of Asuncion.

References 

 Publications of the weekly "Times of the world."
 Geography of Paraguay.
 Che reta Paraguay.
 Data from the DGEEC.
 American Genocide. The war of Paraguay. Juan Jose Chiavenato. Carlos Schaum Editor, Asuncion, 1984.

External links 
 National Secretariat of Tourism. Paraguay

Districts of Cordillera Department